Pterodactylidae is a controversial group of pterosaurs. During the 2000s and 2010s, several competing definitions for the various Jurassic pterodactyloid groups were proposed. Pereda-Suberbiola et al. (2012) used Fabien Knoll's (2000) definition of the name Pterodactylidae. Knoll had defined Pterodactylidae as a clade containing "Pterodactylus antiquus, Ctenochasma elegans, their most recent common ancestor and all its descendants". Using this definition with the analysis conducted by Pereda-Suberbiola et al. (2012) meant that Ctenochasmatoidea was nested inside Pterodactylidae.

Classification
Below is the majority-rule consensus tree found by Pereda-Suberbiola et al. (2012), showing their preferred definitions of Pterodactylidae and Ctenochasmatoidea.

Other researchers, such as David Unwin, have traditionally defined Pterodactylidae in such a way to ensure it is nested within Ctenochasmatoidea instead. In 2003, Unwin defined the same clade (Pterodactylus + Pterodaustro) with the name Euctenochasmatia. Unwin considered this to be a subgroup within Ctenochasmatoidea, but most analyses since have found Pterodactylus to be more primitive than he thought, making Euctenochasmatia the more inclusive group.

References

Pterodactyloids
Taxa named by Charles Lucien Bonaparte